The 1998 United States Senate election in North Carolina was held November 3, 1998. Incumbent Republican U.S. Senator Lauch Faircloth decided to seek re-election to a second term, but was unseated by Democrat John Edwards, a trial attorney. , this is the last time a Democrat won North Carolina’s class 3 Senate seat. Edwards declined to run for reelection in 2004.

Party primaries

Democratic primary 
Going into the 1998 campaign, several prominent Democrats declined to run for Senate, including Attorney General Mike Easley, former Mayor of Charlotte Harvey Gantt, and former Glaxo CEO and 1996 Senate candidate Charlie Sanders.

In the Democratic primary, Edwards defeated his closest rival D.G. Martin, former vice chancellor of the University of North Carolina at Chapel Hill. The race also featured former Charlotte city councilwoman Ella Scarborough and several minor candidates.

Republican primary 
In the Republican primary, Faircloth easily defeated two minor candidates.

General election

Major candidates

Democratic 
 John Edwards, attorney

Republican 
 Lauch Faircloth, incumbent U.S. Senator

Campaign 
During the campaign, Edwards fashioned himself as a "people's advocate", while Faircloth accused Edwards of being too friendly towards labor unions. Referring to Edwards as a "tobacco-taxing liberal", Faircloth's campaign ran ads alleging that Edwards' position on tobacco regulation would lead to job losses in the state.

Edwards' campaign refused financial support from political action committees and ran ads criticizing Faircloth's record on Medicare and Social Security. Edwards' victory was partially attributed by some observers to blowback against the Faircloth campaign's use of negative advertising.

Results

See also 
 1998 United States Senate elections

References 

1998
North Carolina
United States Senate
John Edwards